Bayt Fiqayt is a village in Dhofar Governorate in southwestern Oman, close to the capital Salalah.

References

Populated places in the Dhofar Governorate